Raymond Richard Krzoska (October 28, 1918 – April 5, 2006) was an American professional basketball player. He played for the Oshkosh All-Stars and Chicago American Gears in the National Basketball League averaged 3.8 points per game. Krzoska was also a high school and college head coach, notably at Wisconsin–Whitewater (1948–1950) and Milwaukee (1963–1970), his alma mater.

He received a graduate degree from Marquette University. Krzoska died from Alzheimer's disease in 2006.

References

External links
 "Ray Krzoska to Coach Cagers at Whitewater", The Milwaukee Journal, August 5, 1948
 "Raymond R. Krzoska obituary", The Milwaukee Journal, April 6, 2006

1918 births
2006 deaths
American men's basketball players
Basketball coaches from Wisconsin
Basketball players from Milwaukee
Chicago American Gears players
Guards (basketball)
High school basketball coaches in Wisconsin
High school football coaches in Wisconsin
Marquette University alumni
Milwaukee Panthers football coaches
Milwaukee Panthers football players
Milwaukee Panthers men's basketball coaches
Milwaukee Panthers men's basketball players
Oshkosh All-Stars players
People from Oneida County, Wisconsin
Sportspeople from Milwaukee
Wisconsin–Whitewater Warhawks men's basketball coaches
Deaths from Alzheimer's disease